Sverre Fehn (14 August 1924 – 23 February 2009) was a Norwegian architect.

Life
Fehn was born at Kongsberg in Buskerud, Norway. He was the son of  John Tryggve Fehn (1894–1981) and Sigrid Johnsen (1895–1985).
He received his architectural education at the Oslo School of Architecture and Design in Oslo. He entered his course of study in 1946 and graduated during 1949.   Among other instructors, he studied under Arne Korsmo (1900–1968).

In 1949, Fehn and architect Geir Grung (1926–1989) won the competition for the Museum Building for the Sandvig Collections at Maihaugen in Lillehammer.
In 1950, Fehn joined  PAGON (Progressive Architects Group Oslo, Norway). The group, which was led by  Arne Korsmo,  had the goal of implementing and promoting modern architecture.

In 1952–1953, during travels in Morocco, he discovered vernacular architecture
, which was to deeply influence his future work. Later he moved to Paris, where he worked for two years in the studio of Jean Prouvé, and where he knew Le Corbusier. On his return to Norway in 1954, he opened a studio of his own in Oslo.  

 
At the age of 34, Fehn gained international recognition for his design of the Norwegian Pavilion at the 1958 Brussels World Exhibition. In the 1960s he produced two works that have remained highlights in his career: the Nordic Pavilion at the Venice Biennale (1962) and the Hedmark Museum in Hamar (1967–79). Other notable works include the Norwegian Glacier Museum at Fjærland (1991-2002) and the  National Museum of Art, Architecture and Design in  Oslo (2003–08).

He was a professor  at Oslo's School of Architecture from 1971 to 1995  and principal from 1986–1989. 
He additionally lectured throughout Europe including at Paris, Stuttgart and Barcelona. He  also lectured in the United States at the Cranbrook Academy of Art in Bloomfield Hills, Michigan,  Cooper Union in New York City and Massachusetts Institute of Technology in Boston.

Projects
Fehn designed over 100 buildings; Some of the most notable are:
1958 – Norwegian Pavilion at the Brussels World's Fair, Belgium
1962 – Nordic Pavilion at the Venice Biennale, Italy
1963 – Villa Schreiner, Oslo
1963-64 – Villa Norrköping, Sweden
1967 – Casa Bødtker House, Oslo
1967-79 – Hedmark Museum in Hamar, Norway
1990 – Villa Busk, Bamble
1991-2002 – Norwegian Glacier Museum, Fjærland
1993-96 – Aukrust Centre in Alvdal
2000 – Ivar Aasen-tunet in Ørsta
2007 – Gyldendal House, Oslo
2003-08 – National Museum of Art, Architecture and Design, Oslo

Awards
In 1961, he was awarded the Houen Foundation Award, jointly with Geir Grung, for the design of the  Økern Nursing Home in Oslo. He received the Houen Foundation Award for his design of the  Hedmark Museum at Hamar in 1975. In 1994 he was appointed Commander in the Order of St. Olav.
 
In 1998, he was awarded the Norsk kulturråds ærespris.
Sverre Fehn was awarded the first Grosch medal in 2001. 
In 2003, he was awarded the Anders Jahre Cultural Prize (Anders Jahres kulturpris).

His highest international honour came in 1997, when he was awarded both the Pritzker Architecture Prize and the Heinrich Tessenow Gold Medal (Heinrich-Tessenow-Medaille).

Personal life 
In 1952, he married  Ingrid Løvberg Pettersen (1929–2005).
Fehn died in his Oslo home at the age of 84. He was survived by his son Guy Fehn and four grandchildren.

References

Other sources
Olaf Fjeld (2009) Sverre Fehn: The Pattern of Thoughts (The Monacelli Press) 
Gennaro Postiglione; Christian Norberg-Schulz (1997) Sverre Fehn   (The Monacelli Press) 
Per-Olaf Fjeld (1983)  Sverre Fehn on the Thought of Construction  (Rizzoli International)

Related reading
The Secret of the Shadow: Light and Shadow in Architecture, 2002 with writings by Sverre Fehn
Sverre Fehn, The poetry of the straight line =: Den rette linjes poesi, 1992
Yukio Futagawa, Sverre Fehn. Glacier Museum. The Aukrust Centre, in "GA Document 56", 1998
Sverre Fehn. Studio Holme, in "GA Houses 58", 1998

External links

Sverre Fehn Arkitekt. Online catalog of works and architecture map guide
Presentation of Sverre Fehn's built projects
Profile on the Pritzker Prize media site

1924 births
2009 deaths
People from Kongsberg
Oslo School of Architecture and Design alumni
Academic staff of the Oslo School of Architecture and Design
Architects from Oslo
Cranbrook Academy of Art faculty
Pritzker Architecture Prize winners
Recipients of the Prince Eugen Medal
Recipients of the St. Olav's Medal